Romeo Murga (1904–1925) was a Chilean poet, writer and translator.

Chilean male poets
1904 births
1925 deaths
People from Copiapó
Chilean translators
20th-century translators
20th-century Chilean poets
20th-century Chilean male writers